Dumbleton is a surname, and may refer to:

 Horatio Norris Dumbleton (1858–1935), English cricketer and officer in the Royal Engineers
 John Dumbleton ( 1310 –  1349), English philosopher
 Lionel Jack Dumbleton (1905–1976), New Zealand entomologist